Thailands Tidende is a free Norwegian-language published in Thailand. Its headquarters are in Pattaya and it was founded in December 2008.

Until January 2019, the newspaper was published in both a monthly paper version and an online version. The paper version was distributed to tourist destinations across Thailand, including Bangkok, Cha-am, Hua Hin, Koh Chang, Ko Samui, Krabi, Pattaya, and Phuket.

Since January 2019, the newspaper has been published only online.

References

External links
Thailands Tidende homepage

Newspapers published in Thailand
Publications established in 2008
Norwegian-language newspapers
Online magazines